Clarence E. Anthony (born October 10, 1959) is an American politician.  In 1984, he was elected as the mayor of South Bay, Florida when he was 24 years old, and served until 2008.

In 1999 he served as President of the National League of Cities (NLC) and in 2013 he was named as that organization's executive director.

He was Treasurer of the United Cities and Local Governments organization (UCLG).

Clarence E. Anthony served on the Board of Directors for The GEO Group.

Anthony is a Fellow of the National Academy of Public Administration.

His son, Reidel Anthony, played in the National Football League for five years as a wide receiver for the Tampa Bay Buccaneers. He also has a wife and daughter, Tammy and Skylar Anthony.

References

External links
CityMayors profile
UCLG entry
GEO Entry
South Bay page

Living people
People from Palm Beach County, Florida
Mayors of places in Florida
African-American mayors in Florida
1959 births
21st-century African-American people
20th-century African-American people